The Canal du Loing in Winter is a painting of the Canal du Loing, produced by Alfred Sisley in winter 1891. It is now in the National Museum of Fine Arts of Algiers.

References

Paintings by Alfred Sisley
1891 paintings